Dorrie Nossiter (29 June 1893 – 1977) was an English jeweller and jewellery designer from Aston, near Birmingham.

Nossiter crafted precious jewellery of her own designs in the English Arts and Crafts Tradition in both sterling silver and gold. Her work is known for her use of colour and floral and curvature lines using gemstones in motifs. She was predominantly active during the 1930s.

Nossiter was educated at the Municipal School of Art in Birmingham from 1910 to 1914. Nossiter married Ernest Guy Robinson in 1922. By 1935 she was living in London where her work was shown in the "Art by Four Women" exhibition at Walker's Gallery, London. Nossiter would go on to exhibit there from 1935 to 1939.

Nossiter's work is often confused with that of another female jeweller and jewellery designer of the same period, Sibyl Dunlop.

References

External links
 Page with Dorrie Nossiter's work

British jewellery designers
British jewellers
English goldsmiths
1893 births
1977 deaths
Women metalsmiths
Women jewellers